The heart urchins or Spatangoida are an order of sea urchins.

Their body is a somewhat elongated oval in form, and is distinguished by the mouth being placed towards one end of the animal, and the anus towards the other. As a result, heart urchins, unlike most other sea urchins, are bilaterally symmetrical, and have a distinct anterior surface. The presence and position of the mouth and anus typically give members of this group the distinct "heart" shape from which they get their name.

Heart urchins have no feeding lantern, and often have petaloids sunk into grooves. They are a relatively diverse order, with a number of varying species.

Taxonomy
According to World Register of Marine Species : 
 suborder Brissidina Stockley, Smith, Littlewood, Lessios & MacKenzie-Dodds, 2005
 family Asterostomatidae Pictet, 1857
 family Brissidae Gray, 1855
 family Palaeotropidae Lambert, 1896
 super-family Spatangidea Fischer, 1966
 family Eupatagidae Lambert, 1905
 family Eurypatagidae Kroh, 2007
 family Loveniidae Lambert, 1905
 family Macropneustidae Lambert, 1905
 family Maretiidae Lambert, 1905
 family Megapneustidae Fourtau, 1905 †
 family Spatangidae Gray, 1825
 family Hemiasteridae H. L. Clark, 1917
 suborder Micrasterina Fischer, 1966
 family Aeropsidae Lambert, 1896
 family Micrasteridae Lambert, 1920a
 family Palaeostomatidae Lovén, 1868
 suborder Paleopneustina Markov & Solovjev, 2001
 superfamily Paleopneustoidea A. Agassiz, 1904
 family Paleopneustidae A. Agassiz, 1904
 family Pericosmidae Lambert, 1905
 family Prenasteridae Lambert, 1905
 family Schizasteridae Lambert, 1905
 family Somaliasteridae Wagner & Durham, 1966a †
 family Toxasteridae Lambert, 1920a †

See also
 Abatus agassizii
 Meoma ventricosa

References
 
 

 
Extant Early Cretaceous first appearances